Simplemente María, is a Venezuela telenovela produced by Venezolana de Televisión in 1972. Is based on an original story by the Argentine writer Celia Alcántara. The series stars Carmen Julia Álvarez, Eduardo Serrano and José Luis Rodríguez.

Cast 
Carmen Julia Álvarez as María
Eduardo Serrano
José Luis Rodríguez
Liliana Durán
Alberto Álvarez as El hombre de goma
Yolanda Muñoz

References 

1972 telenovelas
Venezuelan telenovelas
Spanish-language telenovelas
Venezolana de Televisión original programming